This is a list of historic houses in the U.S. state of Missouri.

Columbia area
David Guitar House, Columbia, Missouri
William B. Hunt House, Columbia, Missouri
John N. and Elizabeth Taylor House, Columbia, Missouri
Maplewood, Columbia, Missouri
Moses U. Payne House, Columbia, Missouri
Greenwood, Columbia, Missouri
David Gordon House and Collins Log Cabin, Columbia, Missouri
Samuel H. and Isabel Smith Elkins House, Columbia, Missouri
East Campus Neighborhood, a NRHP district consisting of mostly houses, in Columbia, Missouri
Sanford F. Conley House, Columbia, Missouri
John W. Boone House, Downtown Columbia, Missouri
Chatol, Centralia, Missouri
Albert Bishop Chance House and Gardens, Centralia, Missouri

North Central
George Caleb Bingham House, Saline County, Arrow Rock, Missouri
Boyhood Home of General John J. Pershing, Linn County, Laclede, Missouri

Northeastern Missouri
Boyhood Home of Mark Twain, Marion County, Hannibal, Missouri
"Champ" Clark House, Pike County, Bowling Green, Missouri

Kansas City area
The John Wornall House Museum, Kansas City, Missouri, 1858 Greek Revival
Harry S. Truman Farm Home, Jackson County, Grandview, Missouri

Lexington
 Aullwood Mansion, Lafayette County, Lexington, Missouri—1904 Georgian mansion
Anderson House, Lafayette County, Lexington, Missouri—1853 Greek Revival mansion
Linwood Lawn, Lafayette County, Lexington, Missouri -- circa 1853 Italianate estate

Springfield Area 
Tiny Town was a park village of miniature houses in 1925
Laura Ingalls Wilder Home and Museum, Wright County, Mansfield, Missouri

St. Joseph
Patee House, Buchanan County, Saint Joseph, Missouri

St. Louis area
Campbell House, St. Louis, Missouri
Chatillon-DeMenil House, St. Louis, Missouri
Cupples House, St. Louis, Missouri
Joseph Erlanger House, St. Louis, Missouri
Eugene Field House, St. Louis, Missouri
Scott Joplin House, St. Louis, Missouri
Shelley House, St. Louis, Missouri
Tower Grove House, St. Louis, Missouri

Ste. Genevieve
Felix Vallé House State Historic Site, Ste. Genevieve, Missouri—c1818 Colonial, Federal style
Beauvais-Amoureux House, Ste. Genevieve, Missouri—c1792 French Colonial
Bequette-Ribault House, Ste. Genevieve, Missouri—c1790s French Colonial
Louis Bolduc House, Ste. Genevieve, Missouri—circa 1785 French Colonial
Jacques Guibourd Historic House, Ste. Genevieve, Missouri—c1806 French Colonial
Old Louisiana Academy, Ste. Genevieve, Missouri—c1808 Colonial, Federal style

Gallery

See also
List of Registered Historic Places in Missouri

External links
List of National Historic Landmarks in Missouri, many, but not all, of these are houses.
Guibourd Historic House webpage 
Foundation for Restoration of Ste. Genevieve, Inc. Guibourd Historic House & Mecker Research Library

Landmarks in Missouri
Historic houses
Historic house museums in Missouri